The Hows of Us is a 2018 Filipino romantic comedy-drama film directed by Cathy Garcia-Molina and starring Kathryn Bernardo and Daniel Padilla.  They were recognized as Phenomenal Box Office Stars and was given the Golden Jury Award and honors at the 50th Guillermo Box Office Entertainment Awards and received the Camera Obscura Award for its success worldwide.

It marked Garcia-Molina's second collaboration with Bernardo and Padilla after the 2014 hit film She's Dating the Gangster. The Hows of Us broke multiple records in the Philippines, including being one of the first locally produced movie to reach  in domestic box-office earnings, which it achieved in 20 days. The film grossed at  under 50 days after its Philippine release. After its original run, it was shown in three countries in Southeast Asia and grossed .

Bernardo won the Best Actress award at the 35th PMPC Star Awards for Movies and Entertainment Editors' Choice Awards for Movies.

Synopsis 
The film is a story about the young couple Primo (Padilla) and George (Bernardo), who dreams of growing old together. However, as their feelings go deep for each other, they have to deal the struggles of being in a long-term relationship and the harsh reality of life.

Cast

Main
 Kathryn Bernardo as Georgina "George" Reyes, a graduating Medical student with Dutch descent on her biological father's side, Primo's love interest.
 Daniel Padilla as Primo Alvarez, an aspiring musician who dreams of performing on stage all over the world, George's love interest.

Supporting
Darren Espanto as Yohan Reyes, George's younger Brother
Jean Garcia as Mama Baby Reyes, George's Mother
Susan Africa as Helen "Tita Lola" Antonio / Lola Leonida Antonio, George's Grandaunt
Alwyn Uytingco as Bowie, Primo's Friend and a member of his rock band
Ria Atayde as Awee, George's Bestfriend
Juan Miguel Severo as Mikko, George's Bestfriend
Odette Khan as Mrs. Abellera, House Buyer
Kit Thompson as Darwin, Primo's Cousin
Ana de Leon as Anna (fictional version of herself), Bowie's Wife

Release
The Hows of Us premiered on cinemas in the Philippines on August 29, 2018. On September 6, 2018, eight days after the domestic release of The Hows of Us, the film started its international screenings in Brunei, Papua New Guinea, and the United Arab Emirates. On the following day, the film premiered in Canada, Malaysia, and the United States. The film also began screening in Saipan in the Northern Mariana Islands. On September 8 and 9, screenings started in Thailand, United Kingdom, Italy, Spain,

The Hows of Us, started showing in regular cinemas in Vietnam on October 26, 2018. It also had a regular screening in Indonesia in November 2018.

Box office

Domestic
The Hows of Us earned ₱35.9 million on its first day. Five days after, it earned ₱279.5 million, making it the biggest opening weekend of a Filipino film of all time. The film also broke many records in a span of 5 days, such as highest single-day gross for a local film; a staggering ₱82.4 million alone on September 2, 2018, and the highest number of cinemas opened for any local film with 435 on September 2, 2018.

As of September 3, 2018, the film gross total earned ₱318 million As of September 7, 2018, the film has grossed ₱404.7 million in just 10 days, breaking the record of A Second Chance which grossed ₱400 million on its 11th day, making it the fastest local non-MMFF film to breached the ₱400M mark. As of September 9, 2018, the movie has grossed a total of ₱505.7 million domestically in just 12 days, making it the fastest local film to breach the ₱500 million mark. After 20 days in still 200 cinemas nationwide, the film has grossed ₱601.2 domestically, beating Gandarrapiddo: The Revenger Squads ₱571 million It is the first Philippine film to breach the ₱600 million mark domestically.

Foreign
It was announced by Star Cinema's executive Roxy Liquigan on their Victory Party (September 12) that the movie has grossed $1 million in 5 days (September 6–10) of overseas screening.

In North America, The Hows of Us earned $537,000 on its first 3 days. After 10 days, the movie earned a whopping $1.2 million. Movie City News reported that the movie has grossed $1.5M in 17 days of screening in North America. In United Kingdom, the movie earned a record-breaking $30,890 in its first 3 days screening in 3 theaters only. While in Australia, the movie posted a potent $64,340 gross on its first 3 days of screening. Box Office Mojo in UAE reported that the movie earned a record-breaking $369,918 4-day opening gross.

After 2 weeks of showing abroad, The Hows of Us breach the two-million-US-dollar mark ($2.043 million) announced by TFC on Twitter. It is the second film starring Bernardo and Padilla to breach the two-million-US-dollar mark abroad, the first one being their 2015 hit Crazy Beautiful You.

On September 26, 2018, the figure rose to $2.3 million.

The Hows of Us has already made $2.675 million (₱144 million), from overseas screenings.

Accolades 

Luna Award

 Best Actor - Daniel Padilla

50th Guillermo Mendoza Awards

 GOLDEN Jury Award For Highest Grossing Film of all Time
 PHENOMENAL Stars of Philippine Cinema – Kathryn Bernardo & Daniel Padilla
 Most Popular Screenwriters – Carmi Raymundo /Crystal San Miguel/Gillian Ebreo/Cathy Garcia Molina
 Most Popular Film Director – Cathy Garcia Molina

Film Development Council of the Philippines (FDCP)

 Camera Obscura Award- FDCP Film Ambassadors 2019 as the Highest Grossing Filipino Film in a Regular Screening

5th Inding-Indie Short Film Festival

 Best Actress – Kathryn Bernardo
 Best Actor – Daniel Padilla

RAWR Awards 2018

 Actress of the Year – Kathryn Bernardo
 Supporting Actor of the Year – Darren Espanto
 Movie ng Taon – The Hows Of Us

Gawad Pasado 2019 ng Pampelikulang Samahan ng mga Dalubguro

 PinakaPASADOng Pelikula – The Hows Of Us (Nominated)
 PinakaPASADOng Aktor – Daniel Padilla (Nominated)
 PinakaPASADOng Aktres – Kathryn Bernardo (Nominated)

35th PMPC Star Awards for Movies

 Best Actress - Kathryn Bernardo

Entertainment Editors' Choice Awards for Movies (EDDY'S) 2019

 Best Actress - Kathryn Bernardo

References

External links
 

Philippine romantic drama films
Star Cinema films
Films directed by Cathy Garcia-Molina
Films set in Amsterdam